Njattadi  is a 1979 Malayalam movie directed by Bharath Gopi and written by T.K. Kochu Narayanan, starring Bharat Murali, K.N. Sreenivasan, Sunil, Girija and Kalamandalam Devaki. It marked the debut directorial venture by Bharath Gopi and acting debut by Bharat Murali. It is a lost film.

Plot
The film is based on the life of the protagonist Unni, who is moved by Naxal ideas. It was banned by the censor board because of the portrayal of naxal ideas. The film was screened only twice and its print is now lost.

Cast
 Sunil as Unni
 Bharath Murali as Raghu
 V. R. Korappath
 Girija
 Kalamandalam Devaki

References

External links
 http://njaattady.blogspot.com/
 
 https://web.archive.org/web/20110825122625/http://rachanabooks.com/index.php?route=product%2Fproduct&product_id=81

1970s Malayalam-language films
Lost Indian films
1970s lost films